Ignacio "Nacho" Monsalve Vicente (born 27 April 1994) is a Spanish professional footballer who plays as a central defender for Polish club ŁKS Łódź.

Club career
Born in Madrid, Monsalve joined Atlético Madrid's youth setup in 2006, aged 12. He made his debut as a senior with the C-team in the 2013–14 campaign, in Tercera División.

Monsalve was promoted to the reserves in June 2014, also making the pre-season with the first team. In March 2016, after the injuries of Diego Godín, José Giménez and Stefan Savić, he was promoted to the main squad.

On 2 April 2016, Monsalve made his professional debut, starting in a 5–1 La Liga home routing over Real Betis. On 19 July he moved to another reserve team, Deportivo de La Coruña B also in the fourth level.

On 24 August 2017, Monsalve signed for Segunda División side Rayo Vallecano, being immediately loaned to Recreativo de Huelva in Segunda División B for one year.

On 3 August 2018, Monsalve moved abroad for the first time in his career, signing for FC Twente in the Dutch Eerste Divisie. After one season with the Tukkers, he signed with NAC Breda from the same country.

On 27 January 2021, Monsalve switched teams and countries again, joining Levski Sofia in Bulgaria.

On 22 June 2021, he completed his move to Polish I liga club ŁKS Łódź, signing the 3-year contract.

References

External links
 
 
 

1994 births
Living people
Footballers from Madrid
Spanish footballers
Association football defenders
La Liga players
Segunda División B players
Tercera División players
Eerste Divisie players
I liga players
Atlético Madrid C players
Atlético Madrid B players
Atlético Madrid footballers
Deportivo Fabril players
Rayo Vallecano players
Recreativo de Huelva players
FC Twente players
NAC Breda players
ŁKS Łódź players
Spanish expatriate footballers
Expatriate footballers in the Netherlands
Expatriate footballers in Poland
Spanish expatriate sportspeople in the Netherlands